The Sunshine Holiday Hotel is an abandoned house on the coastline of Xichong, Shenzhen, Guangdong Province, China. Its nickname probably came from tourists and backpackers. It is noted because backpackers can rest in the house and enjoy views of the South China Sea.

It is a well-known building among the backpackers of Shenzhen.

References

Buildings and structures in Shenzhen